Henry Antonio García Orozco (born 3 August 1991) is a Nicaraguan footballer who plays as a striker for Liga Primera club Real Estelí FC and the Nicaragua national team.

Early life
Garcìa was born in Diriamba.

Club career
García has played for Juventus Managua, UNAN Managua, Real Estelí and Managua FC in Nicaragua.

International career
García made his senior debut for Nicaragua on 24 February 2012.

References

1991 births
Living people
People from Carazo Department
Nicaraguan men's footballers
Association football forwards
Juventus Managua players
UNAN Managua players
Real Estelí F.C. players
Managua F.C. players
Nicaraguan Primera División players
Nicaragua international footballers